Aloran, officially the Municipality of Aloran, is a 4th class municipality in the province of Misamis Occidental, Philippines. According to the 2020 census, it has a population of 27,934 people.

Geography

Climate

Barangay
Aloran is politically subdivided into 38 barangays.

Demographics

Economy

Festival
"Bunga Dag Tabinal Festival" is held every September 21.

Gallery

References

External links

 [ Philippine Standard Geographic Code]
Philippine Census Information
 Local Governance Performance Management System

Municipalities of Misamis Occidental